Nebria araschinica is a species of ground beetle in the  Nebriinae subfamily that can be found in Armenia and Turkey.

References

araschinica
Beetles described in 1892
Beetles of Asia